Georg Neithardt (31 January 1871 — 1 November 1941) was the district court director of the Munich People's Court in Germany's Weimar Republic. In February and March 1924, Neithardt presided over the trial of Adolf Hitler, Erich Ludendorff, and eight additional leaders of the 1923 Beer Hall Putsch.

Bayernbund meeting trial

In September 1921, Hitler was arrested after he and members of his SA paramilitary faction disrupted a Bayernbund meeting hosting the federalist Ballerstedt. Neithardt presided over Hitler's trial, which sentenced Hitler to five years in prison. Hitler served nine months of his sentence.

Beer Hall Putsch trial

Sympathetic to far-right politics in Germany, Neithardt presided over the Beer Hall Putsch trial, which lasted from 26 February to 1 April 1924. Neithardt treated Hitler, Ludendorff and other defendants on friendly terms, and referred to Ludendorff as "your excellency." Hitler used the trial to propagandize against democracy in Germany and argued that his attempted coup-d'etat could not have been treason, if its aim was to negate the treason of Germany's armistice signed in 1918.

References

People of the Weimar Republic
1871 births
1941 deaths